Vera Feyder (born 1939) is a Belgian writer and comedian living in France.

Her father was a Polish Jew who died while being sent to Auschwitz; her mother was Belgian of Serb descent. She was born in Liège and was educated at the Académie Grétry there. During her youth, she suffered from tuberculosis and anorexia, which required long periods of convalescence. At the age of 19, she moved to Paris.

She published her first collection of poems Le Temps démuni in 1961, which received the Prix "Découverte". Her first novel La Derelitta received the Prix Victor-Rossel; it was adapted into a film in 1981. In 2008, she was awarded the Prix poésie Paul Verlaine de l’Académie française for her work.

Feyder wrote scripts for dramas and literary programs for France Culture, the Radio Suisse Romande and the RTBF. In 1985, she was awarded the Prix Radio de la SACD for her work. From 1999 to 2002, Feyder was vice-president of the Commission Radio de la SACD.

Awards
 Prix "Découverte"
 Prix Victor-Rossel
 Prix poésie Paul Verlaine de l’Académie française
 Prix Radio de la SACD

Selected works 
 Un jaspe pour Liza, novella (1965)
 Pays l'absence, poetry (1970), received the Prix François Villon
 Passionnaire, poetry (1974), received the Prix Broquette-Gonin awarded by the Académie française
 Emballage perdu, play (1982), translated in English as No deposit, no return (1986)
 Le fond de l'être est froid. 1966-1992, poetry anthology (1995), received the Prix de poésie de la SGDL
 Petite suite de pertes irréparables, play (1998)
 La bouche de l'ogre, play (2002), received the Prix Littérature Amnesty 
 Piano seul, play (2003), received the Prix Louis Praga
 Ô Humanité, stories (2008)

References

External links 
 

1939 births
Living people
Belgian women novelists
Belgian poets in French
20th-century Belgian dramatists and playwrights
Belgian women dramatists and playwrights
Writers from Liège
Writers from Paris
20th-century Belgian novelists
20th-century Belgian poets
Belgian radio writers
Women radio writers
Belgian women poets
Belgian women short story writers
Belgian short story writers
20th-century short story writers
Belgian people of Serbian descent
Belgian people of Polish-Jewish descent
Winners of the Prix Broquette-Gonin (literature)
20th-century Belgian women writers